Elbert Adrain Brinckerhoff, Sr. (November 29, 1838 – March 23, 1913) was the Mayor of Englewood, New Jersey and the founder of Brinckerhoff, Turner and Company. He was president of Merchants' National Bank and president of Columbia Presbyterian Hospital in New York City and vice president of the American Bible Society.

Early life
He was born on November 29, 1838, in Jamaica, Queens, New York. He was a son of Mary (née Adrain) Brinckeroff and John N. Brinckeroff, principal of Union Hall Academy in Jamaica.  He was a grandson of Irish-American mathematician Robert Adrain, who is chiefly remembered for his formulation of the method of least squares.

Career
In 1854, at age 16, he traveled to San Francisco aboard the Adelaide and he took a job with Wells Fargo where he delivered the first pony express package from San Francisco to Sacramento. He later joined the San Francisco Committee of Vigilance during the presidency of William Coleman. He returned to New York City in 1860.

In New York City, he became associated with Fox & Polhemus, cotton manufacturers and brokers, where he later became an owner.  He later became senior member of the firm and it was renamed Brinckerhoff, Turner & Co.  For many years, he also served as president of the Merchants' National Bank, president of Columbia Presbyterian Hospital, vice president of the American Bible Society and a director of the Harriman National Bank.

He was elected Mayor of Englewood, New Jersey in 1899 and recommended an increase in the police force from seven police officers to nine police officers. He also recommended the building of the city hall.

Personal life
He moved to Englewood, New Jersey in 1867.  On April 22, 1869, he was married to Emily Augusta Vermilye (1846–1921), a daughter of Col. Washington Romeyn Vermilye, a banker.  They were the parents of one son and six daughters, including:
 Emily Vermilye Brinckerhoff (1870–1945), who married Frederick Smyth Duncan (1868–1953).
 Mary Elizabeth Brinckerhoff (1871–1931), who married James Douglas Armstrong (1866–1939) in 1894.
 Elbert Adrain Brinckerhoff Jr. (1874–1943), who married Edna Connor (1874–1938).
 Elizabeth Lathrop Brinckerhoff (1876–1950), who married William Bushnell Chapin (1875–1914) in 1901. After his death, she married widower Lt. Col. Frederick Butterfield Ryons (1877–1946) in 1923.
 Helen M. Brinckerhoff (1881–1953), who married Maxwell Van Buskirk (1871–1952).

He died in Englewood on March 23, 1913 and was buried in Brookside Cemetery there.

References

External links
 

Mayors of Englewood, New Jersey
1838 births
1913 deaths
American Bible Society
Burials at Brookside Cemetery (Englewood, New Jersey)
19th-century American politicians